Francis Charles Turner (born June 2, 1951) is a Canadian actor and iconographer born in Wainwright, Alberta and now living in British Columbia. He has appeared in numerous films, made-for-television films, television shows, and plays.

Biography
He received his theatrical training at the University of Alberta, graduating in 1975 with a BFA in acting. For the first few years after graduation he acted in theatres across western Canada and Ontario. In 1983 he moved to Vancouver, BC and has worked mainly in film since then. In 2003 he appeared as George Bernard Shaw in debate with G. K. Chesterton on G. K. CHESTERTON: THE APOSTLE OF COMMON SENSE with EWTN, a performance previously given in Calgary, and St. Paul, Minnesota. In 1991 he began studying iconography under Vladislav Andreyev. A frequent attendee of the Mount Angel Iconography Institute where he studied with Charles Rohrbacher, Mary Katsilometes, Claudia Coos, and Cathy Sievers; more recently he studied in Cottonwood, Idaho with Father Gianluca Busi from Bologna.  In 2007, he spent six weeks in Bologna painting and being immersed in Catholic iconography. Along with Chris Kielsinki and Michal Janek, Frank was a founding member of Epiphany Sacred Arts Guild, and served as its president for ten years. He also served on the curriculum advisory board of Living Water College of the Arts. Married in 1976, he has four children.

Filmography

Film

Television

References

External links
 

1951 births
Living people
Canadian male film actors
Canadian male television actors
Male actors from Alberta